Nor Artagers, is a village in the Armavir Province of Armenia. The village is inhabited by Armenians (52%, around 641 individuals), Yazidis (27%, around 327 individuals) and Assyrians (21%, around 256 individuals).

See also 
Armavir Province

References

World Gazeteer: Armenia – World-Gazetteer.com

Populated places in Armavir Province
Assyrian settlements
Assyrians in Armenia
Yazidi villages
Yazidi populated places in Armenia